Lex Rex is the sixth studio album by American progressive rock band Glass Hammer, released on September 1, 2002.

It is the first album of the band to be released with the same line-up at his predecessor. This line-up, consisting of Fred Schendel, Steve Babb, Susie Bogdanowicz and Walter Moore, would last until their tenth studio album, 2007's Culture of Ascent.

Track listing

Personnel
Glass Hammer
 Fred Schendel – lead and backing vocals, steel guitars, electric and acoustic guitars, Hammond organ, piano, pipe organ, keyboards, synthesizers, Mellotron, mandolin, recorder, drums, percussion
 Steve Babb – lead and backing vocals, four and eight-string bass guitars, keyboards, pipe organ, Hammond organ, Mellotron
 Susie Bogdanowicz – lead vocals and backing vocals
 Walter Moore – lead and backing vocals

Additional musicians
 Sarah Lowell – lead and backing vocals
 Haley McGuire – lead and backing vocals
 Carrie Streets – backing vocals
 Bjorn Lynne – lead guitar on "Tales of the Great Wars"
 Charlie Shelton – lead guitar on "One King"
 David Carter – lead guitar on "Further Up and Further In"

Production
 Fred Schendel – producer
 Steve Babb – producer
 Rosana Azar – cover art

References 

Glass Hammer albums
2002 albums